The 1930 United States Senate special election in Ohio was held on Tuesday November 4, to elect a successor to Senator Theodore E. Burton, who died in office in October 1929. United States Representative Roscoe C. McCulloch, who was appointed to fill the vacant seat, was to complete the term but was defeated by United States Representative Robert J. Bulkley.

General election

Candidates
Robert J. Bulkley, U.S. Representative from Cleveland (Democratic)
Roscoe C. McCulloch, interim appointee Senator and former U.S. Representative from Canton (Republican)

Results

See also 
 1930 United States Senate elections

References

1930
Ohio
United States Senate
Ohio 1930
Ohio 1930
United States Senate 1930